Nara Cercle is an administrative subdivision of the Koulikoro Region of Mali. Its seat is the town of Nara.

Nara Cercle is the northernmost area of Koulikoro Region, and abuts the desert regions of Mauritania to the north.   It covers some 30,000 km2, and is home to Bambara and Sarakole (Soninké) peoples, as well as semi-nomadic Maure and Fula peoples, engaged in farming and livestock raising.

Administrative divisions
Nara Cercle is divided into 11 communes:

Allahina
Dabo
Dilly
Dogofry
Fallou
Guéniébé
Guiré
Koronga
Nara
Niamana
Ouagadou

Notes

Cercles of Mali
Koulikoro Region